On 1 July 2022, at 01:00 AM (UTC+3), a Russian missile hit a residential building and two missiles hit a recreational center in Serhiivka, in Bilhorod-Dnistrovskyi Raion (Odesa Oblast). The missile strike killed at least 21 people (including a 12-year-old boy). The event has signs of a war crime. July 2 was declared a day of mourning in the region.

Course of events 

According to preliminary information, three Tu-22M3 aircraft of the Russian Air Force flew from the Volgograd Oblast to Crimea, and after  fired three Kh-22s, supersonic anti-ship missiles designed for use against aircraft carriers, in the direction of the Bilhorod-Dnistrovskyi district to the resort Serhiivka village.

One missile hit a 9-story residential building, completely destroying one section. The fire spread from the apartment building to the attached store.

The second missile hit a recreation center in the Bilhorod-Dnistrovskyi region. The fire did not start at the recreation center.

As a result of these strikes, a rehabilitation center for children administered by Moldova in the village was hit. One of its workers died and five others were injured.

Victims 
According to preliminary data, at least 16 Ukrainian civilians were killed in the residential building and at least 5 (including a 12 year old boy) in the recreation center. 38 were injured (including 6 children). In addition to people, pets also have died.

Reactions 
2 July was declared a day of mourning in the region. The Ministry of Foreign Affairs and European Integration of Moldova condemned the attack and gave information about the damages the Moldovan rehabilitation center had suffered. Romania also condemned the attack, and said that the Romanian authorities would be in contact with its Moldovan partners.

Ukrainian President Zelenskyy accused Russia of having committed "an act of conscious, deliberately targeted Russian terror – and not some kind of mistake." He noted that as in the recent Kremenchuk shopping mall attack, the Russian army used unnecessarily powerful weapons to strike a civilian object: "These missiles, Kh-22, were designed to destroy aircraft carriers and other large warships, and the Russian army used them against an ordinary nine-story building with ordinary civilian people."

Official representative of Germany  described the missile strike as an "inhumane and cynical" war crime.

A spokesman of the Russian Presidency, Dmitry Peskov, denied that Russia was attacking civilian objects in Ukraine and said that the targeted buildings were used for military purposes. Amnesty International visited the locations and studied satellite imagery, finding no evidence that the targeted buildings were used by the military.

References

External links 
 

July 2022 events in Ukraine
2020s building bombings
21st-century mass murder in Ukraine
History of Odesa Oblast
Airstrikes during the 2022 Russian invasion of Ukraine
Attacks on buildings and structures in 2022
Attacks on buildings and structures in Ukraine
Building bombings in Europe
Mass murder in 2022
Russian war crimes in Ukraine
War crimes during the 2022 Russian invasion of Ukraine
July 2022 crimes in Europe
Child murder during the 2022 Russian invasion of Ukraine
Airstrikes conducted by Russia